Vitaxin (MEDI-523) is a humanized monoclonal antibody against the vascular integrin alpha-v beta-3. It is shown to be a promising angiogenesis inhibitor used in the treatment of some forms of cancer. Vitaxin was in 2002 being studied for rheumatoid arthritis. It is the developmental precursor of Etaracizumab (MEDI-522). Both are derived from the mouse antibody LM609.

Vitaxin is safe for humans. It has little effect on advanced cancer.

References 

Angiogenesis inhibitors
Angiology